Carroll v. United States, 267 U.S. 132 (1925), was a decision by the United States Supreme Court that upheld the warrantless searches of an automobile, which is known as the automobile exception. The case has also been cited as widening the scope of warrantless search.

Background
During prohibition, officers arranged an undercover purchase of liquor from George Carroll, an illicit dealer under investigation, but the transaction was not completed. They later saw Carroll and John Kiro driving on the highway from Detroit to Grand Rapids, Michigan, which they regularly patrolled. They pursued them, pulled them over, and searched the car, finding illegal liquor behind the rear seat.

The National Prohibition Act provided that officers could make warrantless searches of vehicles, boats, or airplanes when they had reason to believe illegal liquor was being transported and that law enforced the Eighteenth Amendment.

Decision
The Court noted that Congress early observed the need for a search warrant in non-border search situations, and Congress always recognized "a necessary difference" between searches of buildings and vehicles "for contraband goods, where it is not practical to secure a warrant, because the vehicle can be quickly moved out of the locality or jurisdiction in which the warrant must be sought." The warrantless search was thus valid.

The Court held, however,
It would be intolerable and unreasonable if a prohibition agent were authorized to stop every automobile on the chance of finding liquor, and thus subject all persons lawfully using the highways to the inconvenience and indignity of such a search.... [T]hose lawfully within the country, entitled to use the public highways, have a right to free passage without interruption or search unless there is known to a competent official, authorized to search, probable cause for believing that their vehicles are carrying contraband or illegal merchandise.

The Court added that where the securing of a warrant is reasonably practicable, it must be used.

That became known as the Carroll doctrine: a vehicle could be searched without a search warrant if there was probable cause to believe that evidence is present in the vehicle, coupled with exigent circumstances to believe that the vehicle could be removed from the area before a warrant could be obtained.

Underneath their opinion, the majority included a note that Justice Joseph McKenna concurred with them before his retirement earlier in the year.

Justices James Clark McReynolds and George Sutherland filed a dissenting opinion. In brief, they believed that the fact that the case involved bootleggers was prejudicial yet not a justification for creating a broad exception to unreasonable search doctrine.

Subsequent events
In 1927, the Florida Legislature enacted the Carroll decision into statute law in Florida, and the statute remains in effect.

In United States v. Di Re, the Court declined to extend Carroll to permit searches of passengers in a vehicle that had apparently been lawfully stopped. In Di Re there was no probable cause to believe that the passenger was holding any evidence.

The Court relied on Carroll in Cooper v. California to observe that a search of a vehicle may be reasonable where the same search of a dwelling may not be reasonable.

See also
Boyd v. United States, 
Chambers v. Maroney, 
Exclusionary rule
List of United States Supreme Court cases, volume 267
United States v. Chadwick, 
Weeks v. United States, 
Arizona v. Gant

References

Further reading

External links

United States Supreme Court cases
United States Fourth Amendment case law
1925 in United States case law
United States Eighteenth Amendment case law
1925 in Michigan
Grand Rapids, Michigan
Vehicle law
Legal history of Michigan
United States Supreme Court cases of the Taft Court
Prohibition in the United States